Anthony Joseph "Tony" Singleton (30 March 1936 – 29 February 2008) was an English footballer who played as a centre half for Preston North End and New York Generals.

Singleton signed for his hometown club in May 1955, and made his first-team debut in 1960.

In the semi-final of Preston's run in the 1963-64 FA Cup, with the score level at 1–1 against Swansea City, Singleton scored a rare goal from 30 yards to win the game and send Preston to the final, where they lost to West Ham United.

References

1936 births
2008 deaths
English footballers
English expatriate footballers
Preston North End F.C. players
Footballers from Preston, Lancashire
New York Generals players
North American Soccer League (1968–1984) players
Expatriate soccer players in the United States
Association football midfielders
English expatriate sportspeople in the United States
FA Cup Final players